Gymnoscelis callichlora is a moth in the family Geometridae. It was described by Alfred Jefferis Turner in 1907 and it is found in Australia (Queensland).

References

Moths described in 1907
callichlora